IBM Big Blue is a Japanese semi-professional rugby union team in the Top League, founded in 1976 by IBM.  The company decided to make rugby, along with baseball and American football, one of the official company sports in 1989, which allowed the rugby club to gain support and momentum.

Big Blue won promotion from the Japan East Ten league to the Top League at the end of the League's first season (2003-4) but was then automatically relegated by coming 12th in the second season (2004-5). The team returned to the Top League for the 2006-7 season. It is based in Chiba prefecture in the Kanto area.

The former head Coach, Ippei Onishi, is a former captain of Kobe Kobelco Steelers. As of 2007–2008, the coach is Hiroki Ando. USA Eagle flyhalf Mike Hercus is a notable alumnus.

Squad 2011/2012

See also
IBM Big Blue (X-League)

References

External links
 IBM Big Blue RFC - official home page

Japanese rugby union teams
Rugby in Kantō
Rugby clubs established in 1976
Sports teams in Chiba Prefecture
Big Blue
1976 establishments in Japan